The 1908 Chicago Physicians and Surgeons football team represented the College of Physicians and Surgeons of Chicago during the 1908 college football season.  In their final season of existence, Chicago P&S compiled a 0–4 record, and scored only 10 points all season while surrendering 204.  Their most notable game was played against an 8–1 Notre Dame team, which scored 88 unanswered points against them.

Schedule

Roster

This Roster was compiled from an account of the Notre Dame contest in the Inter Ocean and against St. Viator in the Chicago Tribune.

 McGinnis, left end, right end
 Hurka, left tackle, right tackle
 Elliott, left guard, right guard
 Herrick, center, left guard
 Puffer, right guard, center
 Kestinger, right tackle, left end
 O'Brien, right end, left tackle
 Sorley, quarterback
 Sterling, quarterback
 Ehland, left halfback
 Smith, left halfback
 McDodle, right halfback
 Gelrick, right halfback
 Langan, right halfback
 Hammond, fullback
 Martin, fullback

References

Chicago Physicians and Surgeons
Chicago Physicians and Surgeons football seasons
Chicago Physicians and Surgeons football